The Lola T97/20 is an open-wheel formula racing car chassis, designed, developed and built by British racing  manufacturer and constructor Lola, for the one-make Indy Lights spec-series, a feeder-series for the CART IndyCar Series, between 1997 and 2001.

References 

Open wheel racing cars
Lola racing cars